The 2003–04 NBA season was the 15th season for the Orlando Magic in the National Basketball Association. During the offseason, the Magic signed free agents Juwan Howard and Tyronn Lue. Injuries hamstrung the Magic from the start of the season as Grant Hill missed the entire season recovering from ankle surgery, while Pat Garrity was lost after just two games with a knee injury. The Magic started the season with an 85–83 win on the road against the New York Knicks. However, their season would go straight down right after as they lost their next 19 games costing head coach Doc Rivers his job. With replacement Johnny Davis taking over, the Magic never recovered from their losing streak as they lost thirteen straight near the end of the season, finishing last place in the Atlantic Division with a league-worst 21–61 record, the franchise's worst record since 1991–92.

The season is notable for Tracy McGrady leading the league in scoring for the second straight time, averaging 28.0 points per game while being selected for the 2004 NBA All-Star Game. Following the season, McGrady requested a trade and was traded along with Howard, Lue and Reece Gaines to the Houston Rockets, and second-year forward Drew Gooden was dealt to the Cleveland Cavaliers.

For this season, they changed their uniforms and wordmarks on their jerseys they remained used until 2008.

Draft picks

Roster

Roster Notes
 Small forward Grant Hill missed the entire season due to an ankle injury.

Regular season

Season standings

z – clinched division title
y – clinched division title
x – clinched playoff spot

Record vs. opponents

Game log

Player statistics

Awards and honors
 Tracy McGrady – All-NBA 2nd Team, Scoring Champion, All-Star

Transactions

References

Orlando Magic seasons
2003 in sports in Florida
2004 in sports in Florida